Patricia Penn Anne Kemp (born 1944), better known simply as Penn Kemp, is a Canadian poet, novelist, playwright, and sound poet who lives in London, Ontario. Kemp has been publishing her writing since 1972 and was London's first poet laureate, serving from 2010 to 2013.

Early life and education 
Kemp was born on August 4, 1944 in Strathroy, Ontario to parents Anne Kemp and James "Jim" Kemp. She was raised in the nearby city of London. Her father was an advertising and publicity executive at London Life, painter, and war artist. Penn says she wrote her first poem when she was six years old.

She earned a Bachelor of Arts degree in English and literature from the University of Western Ontario in 1966 and received certification as a teacher in 1968. In 1988 she received an Ontario Graduate Scholarship to complete a Masters of Education degree at the University of Toronto.

Career 
Kemp taught high school English in Timmins and North York, Toronto for several years.

Kemp's first book, Bearing Down, was published by Coach House in 1972. In 1973, it was performed as a radio show for four voices in Seattle. In 1984, Kemp was writer in residence for Niagara Erie Writers in New York State; for the Labrador School Board in 1986; for Flesherton Library in 1988 and '89; and at SNDT Women's University in Mumbai in 1995. In 1994, Kemp's play, What the Ear Hears Last, was produced by Theatre Passe Muraille in Toronto and, in the same year, she was featured on the CBC Radio show, "Sounding Off." In 1995 the Indian Institute of Canadian studies sponsored her tour of Mumbai colleges and universities.

She was London's inaugural Poet Laureate, serving from 2010 to 2013 and University of Western Ontario's Writer-in-Residence (2009-2010). Kemp runs Pendas Productions.

In 2021, Kemp was commissioned by Brescia University College to deliver their inaugural Women's Day Poem. During the university's fourth annual Dr. Colleen Hanycz Leadership Lecture, Kemp performed her poem "Choose to Challenge" as a riff on the theme, "Choose To Challenge: Finding Common Ground Through Dialogue."

Personal life 
Kemp's left London, Ontario after graduating from Western University. She returned in 2001 and her mother had a stroke. She now lives in London and considers it her home. Her husband, Gavin Stairs, developed vascular dementia and died in fall 2021.

Works

Theater

'Homeward Bound (2015); The Spousal Song (2013). PlayWrights Cabaret, The Grand Theatre, London, 
'The Dream Life of Teresa Harris, Eldon House, London (2013)
'Scenes from the Electric Folklore Machine, Aeolian Hall, London (2012)
'Mrtvolka, with Anne Anglin, Daniela Sneppova, Harbourfront Studio Theatre, Toronto
'The Space Between: A Transmorphous Journey, Wolf Performance Hall, London (2010)
'Re-Visions: a sound opera, with Brenda McMorrow, Bill Gilliam, Aeolian Hall, London (2009)
'What the Ear Might Hear, (2009); When the Heart Parts, Playwrights Cabaret (2007)
'Communication Breakdown, with Chris Meloche, McManus Theatre, London (2008)
'Re:Animating Animus: a sound opera, Aeolian Hall,  London (2008)
'Xtra Text/ure. Symposium, Playing the Gallery: McIntosh Gallery Western U, London (2007)
'Darkness Visible: a sound opera, with Chris Meloche, Aeolian Hall, London (2006)
'Trance Dance Form: sound opera, with Bill Gilliam, Jean Martin, Brick Works, Toronto (2006)
'Vocal Braiding: an experiment in poetry and theatre (with Patricia Keeney, directed by Don Rubin, 2000.) Performed in Jaipur, India and for Indian television; York University 
'Symposium on Canadian Theatre at the University of Rajasthan (with Don Rubin, 2000) 
'Temporary Harmonies, The Music Gallery, Toronto; U. of Mumbai, India 
'What The Ear Hears Last (The Gathering); Eros Rising, 1978, Theatre Passe Muraille, Toronto
'Angel Makers, Red  Theatre, Toronto. Trance Dance Form, Harbourfront, Toronto (1976) 
'The Epic of Toad and Heron: a play.  Toronto Island Clubhouse and ON schools, (1977-2012)
The Dream Life of Teresa Harris (2013)

Individual poems
"Simultaneous Translation" in 
"The Dream Life of Teresa Harris" in

Poetry collections

Recordings 
On Our Own Spoke. Penn Kemp, Toronto: Pendas Productions, 2000. (CD/CD-ROM)
Two Lips. Penn Kemp, Anne Anglin, and Susan McMaster, Toronto: Pendas Productions, 2001. (CD)
Time Less Time. Penn Kemp, Darren Copeland, and Claude Gillard, Toronto: Pendas Productions, 2001. (CD)
Souwesto Words: 25 poets in Southwestern Ontario. Includes recordings from Penn Kemp, John Tyndall, Molly Peacock, Emily Chung, Paul Langille, Sheila Martindale, Roy McDonald, Sadiqa Khan, Jan Figurski, Jody Trevail, Beryl Baigent, John B. Lee, Cornelia Hoogland, James Reaney, Colleen Thibaudeau, Michael Wilson, Aimee O'Beirn, Jason Dickson, Marianne Micros, Skot Deeming, Victor Elias, David J. Paul, April Bulmer, Julie Berry, Don Gutteridge, Ergo Books, 2002. (CD)

As editor

Other works 

 Text and introduction to

Awards 
In 2012, Kemp was awarded the League of Canadian Poets’ Life Membership Award. Kemp received a Queen Elizabeth II Diamond Jubilee Medal in 2013 for her service to the arts. In 2015, the League of Canadian Poets awarded Kemp the Sheri-D Wilson Golden Beret Award, which honoured her as a spoken-word poet.

External links
Penn Kemp - Penn, poet/playwright/performer
Canadian Poetry Online - Penn Kemp: Biography
Penn Kemp, Poet Facebook page
Penn Kemp on Twitter
Penn Kemp works on Canadian Play Outlet
Mary McDonald collaborations with Penn Kemp

References

1944 births
Living people
Canadian women poets
University of Western Ontario alumni
University of Toronto alumni
Canadian schoolteachers
Poets Laureate of places in Canada
Canadian women dramatists and playwrights
People from Strathroy-Caradoc
Spoken word poets
Writers from Ontario